Lieutenant-Colonel William Thomas Marshall VC (5 December 1854 – 11 September 1920) was an English recipient of the Victoria Cross, the highest and most prestigious award for gallantry in the face of the enemy that can be awarded to British and Commonwealth forces.

Details
Marshall was 29 years old, and a quartermaster-sergeant in the 19th Hussars, British Army during the Mahdist War when the following deed took place for which he was awarded the VC.

He became quartermaster in the regiment on 20 January 1885, and was promoted to Honorary captain on 20 January 1895. In 1902 he was acting quartermaster of the 2nd Provisional Regiment of Dragoons. In 1905, as a major, he became Camp Quartermaster of Aldershot. He retired in 1907. In 1918 he was promoted lieutenant-colonel.

His Victoria Cross is displayed in The Light Dragoons (15th/19th King's Royal Hussars) Museum Collection at the Discovery Museum, Newcastle upon Tyne, England.

References

Angloboer War
Location of grave and VC medal (Fife)

British Army personnel of the Mahdist War
British recipients of the Victoria Cross
19th Royal Hussars soldiers
19th Royal Hussars officers
1854 births
1920 deaths
People from Newark-on-Trent
British Army personnel of the Anglo-Egyptian War
British Army personnel of the Second Boer War
British Army recipients of the Victoria Cross